Sidorshor is a rural locality (a village) in Leninskoye Rural Settlement, Kudymkarsky District, Perm Krai, Russia. The population was 182 as of 2010. There are 6 streets.

Geography 
Sidorshor is located 23 km south of Kudymkar (the district's administrative centre) by road. Verkh-Yusva is the nearest rural locality.

References 

Rural localities in Kudymkarsky District